Sligo is a town in Ireland.

Sligo may also refer to:

Ireland
County Sligo, a county of Ireland

Parliamentary constituencies
Sligo County (Parliament of Ireland constituency), before 1801
Sligo Borough (Parliament of Ireland constituency), before 1801
Sligo County (UK Parliament constituency), 1801–1870
Sligo Borough (UK Parliament constituency), 1801–1870
Sligo County (UK Parliament constituency), 1870–1885
North Sligo (UK Parliament constituency), 1885–1922
South Sligo (UK Parliament constituency), 1885–1922
Sligo–Mayo East (Dáil constituency), 1922–1923
Leitrim–Sligo (Dáil constituency), 1923–1937
Sligo (Dáil constituency), 1937–1948
Sligo–Leitrim (Dáil constituency), 1948–1969
Sligo–Leitrim (Dáil constituency), 1969–2007
Sligo–North Leitrim (Dáil constituency), 2007–

United States
Sligo, Maryland, an area in Montgomery County
Sligo Creek, a tributary of the Anacostia River in Maryland
Sligo, Missouri, a village in Dent County
Sligo, North Carolina, an unincorporated community in Currituck County
Sligo, Ohio, an unincorporated community in Clinton County
Sligo, Pennsylvania, a borough in Clarion County
Sligo, Allegheny County, Pennsylvania, a ghost town in Harrison Township

Other uses
Sligo, a community in Caledon, Ontario

See also
 Siligo, a municipality in Sardinia